Dauda Abasama II was a Sultan of Kano who reigned from 1776-1781.

Biography in the Kano Chronicle
Below is a biography of Dauda Abasama II from Palmer's 1908 English translation of the Kano Chronicle.

References

Monarchs of Kano